Mykyta Valentynovych Kononov (born 22 January 2003) is a Ukrainian professional footballer who plays as a right-back for Dnipro-1.

Club career

Early years
Born in Dnipro, Kononov began his career in the Dnipro academy from his native city. Then he continued in the Dnipro-1 academy.

Dnipro-1
In August 2019 he signed a contract with the newly promoted Ukrainian Premier League side Dnipro-1, but only played in the Ukrainian Premier League Reserves and made his debut in the Ukrainian Premier League as a second-half substitute player in the winning away match against Metalist Kharkiv on 23 October 2022.

References

External links
 
 

2003 births
Living people
Footballers from Dnipro
Ukrainian footballers
Ukraine youth international footballers
Association football defenders
SC Dnipro-1 players
Ukrainian Premier League players
Dnipro Academy people